Klenik is a village east of Pivka in the Inner Carniola region of Slovenia.

The local church in the settlement is dedicated to Saint Leonard and belongs to the Parish of Trnje.

References

External links

Klenik on Geopedia

Populated places in the Municipality of Pivka